In analytical mechanics, the mass matrix is a symmetric matrix  that expresses the connection between the time derivative  of the generalized coordinate vector  of a system and the kinetic energy  of that system, by the equation

where  denotes the transpose of the vector . This equation is analogous to the formula for the kinetic energy of a particle with mass  and velocity , namely

In general, the mass matrix  depends on the state , and therefore varies with time.

Lagrangian mechanics yields an ordinary differential equation (actually, a system of coupled differential equations) that describes the evolution of a system in terms of an arbitrary vector of generalized coordinates that completely defines the position of every particle in the system.  The kinetic energy formula above is one term of that equation, that represents the total kinetic energy of all the particles.

Examples

Two-body unidimensional system 

For example, consider a system consisting of two point-like masses confined to a straight track.  The state of that systems can be described by a vector  of two generalized coordinates, namely the positions of the two particles along the track. 

Supposing the particles have masses , the kinetic energy of the system is

This formula can also be written as

where

N-body system 
More generally, consider a system of  particles labelled by an index , where the position of particle number  is defined by  free Cartesian coordinates (where ).  Let  be the column vector comprising all those coordinates.  The mass matrix  is the diagonal block matrix where in each block the diagonal elements are the mass of the corresponding particle:

where  is the  identity matrix, or more fully:

Rotating dumbbell 

For a less trivial example, consider two point-like objects with masses , attached to the ends of a rigid massless bar with length , the assembly being free to rotate and slide over a fixed plane.  The state of the system can be described by the generalized coordinate vector 
 

The positions and velocities of the two particles are

and their total kinetic energy is 

This formula can be written in matrix form as

where

Note that the matrix depends on the current angle  of the bar.

Continuum mechanics

For discrete approximations of continuum mechanics as in the finite element method, there may be more than one way to construct the mass matrix, depending on desired computational accuracy and performance. For example, a lumped-mass method, in which the deformation of each element is ignored, creates a diagonal mass matrix and negates the need to integrate mass across the deformed element.

See also 

 Moment of inertia
 Stress–energy tensor
 Stiffness matrix
 Scleronomous

References

Computational science